Ceremonial is the 11th album by Hard rock band Pink Cream 69, released in 2013. It's the band's first album with a new line-up change, this time featuring drummer Chris Schmidt replacing founding member Kosta Zafiriou.

Background  
Some statements about the album written by bass player/producer Dennis Ward and vocalist David Readman:
"We deliberately called the album “Ceremonial” because we feel it’s kind of a celebration of music styles we all grew up with, regardless of what PC69 has done in the past", Ward.
"There were various projects that I was involved in over the last couple of years", adds singer David Readman. "But the work on “Ceremonial” felt like coming home. A real relief."

Track listing 
All songs written by Alfred Koffler and Dennis Ward, except where noted.

Personnel 
 David Readman – vocals
 Alfred Koffler – guitar
 Uwe Reitenauer - guitar
 Dennis Ward – bass guitar, backing vocals
 Chris Schmidt – drums

References

External links 
 
 MelodicRock.Com website

2013 albums
Pink Cream 69 albums
Albums produced by Dennis Ward (musician)
Frontiers Records albums